Events from the year 2015 in the British Virgin Islands.

Incumbents
Governor: John Duncan
Premier: Orlando Smith

Events

January
 18 January 2015 - James Taylor, the oldest living resident in the Territory, dies at the age of 101.
 29 January 2015 - Telecoms Regulatory Commission launches enquiry into poor broadband service in the Territory.

February
 10 February 2015 - Baba Aziz is confirmed as Attorney General.  He had previously held the post on an "acting" basis.

March
 26 March 2015 - After years of delays, the Legal Professions Act 2015 is passed into law.

April
 28 April 2015 - The new cruise ship pier park is officially opened, even though it has not actually been completed.

June

 8 June 2015 - The ruling National Democratic Party cruises to victory in a snap general election, increasing its overall majority.  Orlando Smith remains Premier.  A post-election report released afterwards by the Election Observer Mission to the Virgin Islands stated that voters described the 2015 campaign as the most negative they had ever witnessed.

July
16 July 2015 - Premier Orlando Smith, whilst affirming his traditional beliefs in marriage, indicates he is open to public consultation on gay marriage.
21 July 2015 - After a month long political impasse, Governor John Duncan determines that Julian Fraser should be appointed Lead of the Opposition.

August
 24 August 2015 - The Telecom Regulatory Commission confirmed that it had received and rejected an application to block WhatsApp and other VOIP software.

October

 2 October 2015 - Fisheries Department confirms that the months-long invasion of Sargassum weed is responsible for widespread fish deaths in the Territory.

Footnotes

 
2010s in the British Virgin Islands
British Virgin Islands